The Manchester Street Bridge is a camelback steel truss bridge in Baraboo Wisconsin in Sauk County. The bridge was constructed in 1884 to carry Manchester Street over the Baraboo River. In 1987 it was moved to Ochsner Park where it was placed on new abutments while still spanning the Baraboo River as pedestrian bridge.

See also
List of bridges documented by the Historic American Engineering Record in Wisconsin

References

External links

Bridges in Wisconsin
Bridges on the National Register of Historic Places in Wisconsin
Historic American Engineering Record in Wisconsin
National Register of Historic Places in Sauk County, Wisconsin